Pseudoprocometis robletella is a moth in the family Xyloryctidae. It was described by Viette in 1956. It is found in Madagascar.

References

Xyloryctidae
Moths described in 1956